The Education in Cesar Department as well as the education in Colombia is regulated by the Ministry of National Education, and managed by the Secretary of Education of the Department of Cesar. The education in the Department of Cesar is divided into Transition (Elementary School) which has Pre Kinder and Kinder grade -4 to 6 year olds-; Primary School (Educacion basica primaria) -7 to 11 year olds-; Secondary School -12 to 15 year olds) and Middle School which (secondary and middle school being equivalent to High School and also called Bachillerato). Higher educational institutions, universities and colleges are divided into private and state owned. The Popular University of Cesar (UPC) is the state owned university of the Department of Cesar.

Main high schools by municipality

Aguachica

Instituto Jose Maria Campo Serrano
Colegio Teresiano Reina del Carmelo 
Colegio Liceo del Sur
Institucion Educativa Guillermo Leon Valencia

Agustin Codazzi

Colegio Cooperativo del Buen Pastor 
Institucion Educativa Gabriel Garcia Marquez

Astrea

Colegio Nacionalizado de Bachillerato Alvaro Araujo Noguera
Instituto Cristiano Pentecostal

Bosconia

Colegio Eloy Quintero Araujo

Chiriguana

Instituto Tecnico Juan Mejia Gomez

Curumani

Colegio Camilo Torres Restrepo

El Copey

Instituto Agricola

Gamarra

Colegio Nacionalizado Rafael Salazar Noche

La Gloria

Instituto Tecnico Integrado La Gloria
Unidad Educativa Ayacucho

Manaure

Concentracion del Desarrollo Rural

Pailitas

Instituto Agricola Rosa Jaimes Barrera

Pelaya

Colegio Integrado de Pelaya
Institucion Educativa Francisco Rinaldy Morato

San Alberto

Institucion Educativa San Alberto Magno

Tamalameque

Colegio de Bachillerato Anibal Martinez Zuleta
(Colegio de Bachillerato Instituto Técnico Agropecuario

Valledupar

Colegio Hispanoamericano 
Colegio Nacional Loperena 
Colegio Parroquial El Carmelo 
Colegio Santa Fe 
Fundacion Colegio Bilingue de Valledupar (FCBV) 
Colegio Gimnasio del Norte 
Colegio Ateneo El Rosario 
Colegio de la Sagrada Familia 
Colegio Fundacion Manuela Beltran
Colegio Maria Montessori 
Colegio Pablo Sexto morning
Colegio Gimnasio del Saber 
Asociacion Educativa del Cesar (ASEDEC)
Centro Educativo Comunal Francisco de Paula Santander
Colegio Anexo a la Universidad Popular del Cesar
Colegio Manuel German Cuello
Colegio Municipal Francisco Molina Sanchez
Colegio Nacional Loperena - Garupal
Colegio San Antonio
Institucion Educativa Alfonso Araujo Cotes
Institucion Educativa Antonio Enrique Diaz Martinez
Institucion Educativa Bello Horizonte
Institucion Educativa Tecnico Upar
Instituto Dagoberto Alvarez Rojas
Instituto Marco Fidel Suarez
Instituto Nocturno Rafael Nunez
Instituto Osvaldo Vergara Fernandez
Instituto Tecnico Comercial Jose Eugenio Martinez
Liceo La Nevada

See also

Education in Colombia

References

External links
 Secretary of Education - Department of Cesar
 Colombian Ministry of National Education
 Popular University of Cesar

 
Education in Colombia by department